The 2015 Tyrepower Tasmania Super Sprint was a motor race for V8 Supercars held on the weekend of 27–29 March 2015. It was the second round of fourteen in the 2015 International V8 Supercars Championship.

Prior to the start of the event, DJR Team Penske's Marcos Ambrose decided to step down from the driver's seat. He announced that he will work with the team and further practice with the car before he returns for the Endurance Cup. Scott Pye, who raced for the team in 2014, was announced as the replacement for Ambrose. David Reynolds and Andre Heimgartner transferred over to the Ford FG X Falcon for the event and the rest of the 2015 season.

Saturday was a good day for Triple Eight Race Engineering's Craig Lowndes, who managed to secure pole position for both races to be held later in the day. Lowndes then proceeded to win the first race of the weekend, ahead of Mark Winterbottom and James Courtney. Erebus Motorsport's Will Davison, who started fourth on the grid, missed out on a potential podium finish after being spun around by Courtney at turn 4 on the first lap. After Davison commented that Courtney's performance was 'stupid' and 'arrogant', no further action on the incident was decided by the race stewards. Lowndes again led home the field in Race 5, ahead of teammate Jamie Whincup.

Lowndes took a clean sweep of pole positions on Sunday taking pole for the  Race 6, alongside Reynolds. The two managed to tangle at turn 2 on the first lap; Lowndes received a pit lane penalty for spinning Reynolds around in the incident. Whincup took the lead and led until the finish line. Chaz Mostert finished second and Shane van Gisbergen finished third. The two wins for Lowndes meant that he moved to 99 ATCC/V8 Supercar wins in his career, while Whincup moved into second place on the all-time wins list with 91, passing Mark Skaife's tally of 90 wins.

Results

Race 4

Qualifying

Race

Race 5

Qualifying

Race

Race 6

Qualifying

Race

Championship standings
 After Race 6 of 36.

Drivers' Championship standings

Teams' Championship standings

 Note: Only the top five positions are included for both sets of standings.

References

External links
Event page on V8 Supercars' official website

Tasmania
March 2015 sports events in Australia